Marie-Josée Morneau (born 4 December 1969) is a Canadian judoka. She competed in the women's lightweight event at the 1996 Summer Olympics.

References

1969 births
Living people
Canadian female judoka
Olympic judoka of Canada
Judoka at the 1996 Summer Olympics
Sportspeople from Longueuil